Astraea (minor planet designation: 5 Astraea) is an asteroid in the asteroid belt. Its surface is highly reflective and its composition is probably a mixture of nickel–iron with silicates of magnesium and iron. It is an S-type asteroid in the Tholen classification system.

Discovery and name
Astraea was the fifth asteroid discovered, on 8 December 1845, by Karl Ludwig Hencke and named for Astraea, a Greek goddess of justice named after the stars. It was his first of two asteroid discoveries. The second was 6 Hebe. A German amateur astronomer and post office headmaster, Hencke was looking for 4 Vesta when he stumbled on Astraea. The King of Prussia awarded him an annual pension of 1,200 marks for the discovery.

Hencke's symbol for Astraea is an inverted anchor, though given Astraea's role with justice and precision, it is perhaps a stylized set of scales, or a typographic substitute for one. 
This symbol is no longer used. The astrological symbol is U+2BD9 ⯙, a stylized percent sign. The modern astronomical symbol is a simple encircled 5 (⑤).

For 38 years after the discovery of the fourth known asteroid, Vesta, in 1807, no further asteroids were discovered. After the discovery of Astraea, five more were discovered during the 1840s, and 47 were found during the 1850s. The discovery of Astraea proved to be the starting point for the eventual demotion of the four original asteroids (which were regarded as planets at the time) to their current status, as it became apparent that these four were only the largest of a new type of celestial body with thousands of members.

Characteristics
Photometry indicates prograde rotation, that the north pole points in the direction of right ascension 9 h 52 min, declination 73° with a 5° uncertainty. This gives an axial tilt of about 33°. With an apparent magnitude of 8.7 (on a favorable opposition on 15 February 2016), it is only the seventeenth-brightest main-belt asteroid, and fainter than, for example, 192 Nausikaa or even 324 Bamberga (at rare near-perihelion oppositions).

An stellar occultation on 6 June 2008 allowed Astraea's diameter to be estimated; it was found to be .

See also 
 Former classification of planets

References

External links 
 2 Telescope images of 5 Astraea
 MNRAS 7 (1846) 27
 Physical characteristics of (5) Astraea at the Small Bodies Data Ferret
 Discovery Circumstances: Numbered Minor Planets (1)-(5000) – Minor Planet Center
 Dictionary of Minor Planet Names, Google books
 
 

Astraea asteroids
Astraea
Astraea
S-type asteroids (SMASS)
S-type asteroids (Tholen)
18451208